Fabriano is a town and comune of Ancona province in the Italian region of the Marche, at  above sea level. Its location on the main highway and rail line from Umbria to the Adriatic make it a mid-sized regional center in the Apennines. Fabriano is the headquarters of the giant appliance maker Indesit (partly owned by Whirlpool).

Fabriano, with Roma, Parma, Torino and Carrara, is an Italian creative city (UNESCO). The town is in the category Folk Arts  (for the Fabriano's handmade paper production).

History
In 1276, Fabriano became one of the earliest places in Europe to produce paper. Since the 13th century and even today, the town has a reputation for fine watermarked paper. This led to Fabriano's prosperity in the Late Middle Ages and the Renaissance, and was also one of the factors that led to the establishment of nearby Foligno in Umbria as one of the earliest printing centers in Italy in the 15th century, from 1470 onwards.

Geography
The municipality borders with Cerreto d'Esi, Costacciaro (PG), Esanatoglia (MC), Fiuminata (MC), Fossato di Vico (PG), Genga, Gualdo Tadino (PG), Matelica (MC), Nocera Umbra (PG), Poggio San Vicino (MC), Sassoferrato, Serra San Quirico and Sigillo (PG).

Frazioni
The hamlets (frazioni)  of Fabriano are:

Albacina, Argignano, Attiggio, Bassano, Bastia, Belvedere, Borgo Tufico, Cacciano, Ca' Maiano, Campodiegoli, Campodonico, Cancelli, Cantia, Castelletta, Ceresola, Ciaramella, Coccore, Collamato, Collegiglioni, Colle Paganello, Cupo, Fontanaldo, Grotte, Marena, Marenella, Marischio, Melano, Moscano, Nebbiano, Paterno, Poggio San Romualdo, Rufano beach, Precicchie, Rocchetta, Rucce, San Donato, San Giovanni, San Michele, San Pietro, Sant'Elia, Serradica, Valgiubbola, Vallemontagnana, Valleremita, Vallina, Varano, Viacce, Vigne.

Main sights
Fabriano's wealth and commitment to the fine arts in the late medieval period have left it with many monuments.

Churches
Fabriano Cathedral, dedicated to San Venanzio (Saint Venantius) (14th century, rebuilt in 1607–17). From the Baroque restoration are the stucco decoration of the interior and the canvasses by Gregorio Preti, Salvator Rosa, Giovanni Francesco Guerrieri, Giuseppe Puglia and Orazio Gentileschi. To the original Cathedral belong the polygonal apse, the cloister and the St Lawrence Chapel with frescoes by Allegretto di Nuzio (c. 1360). Also important are the frescoes with Stories of the True Cross by the Folignate painter Giovanni di Corraduccio (1415).
San Filippo Neri - Church in 14th century attached to hospital, converted to oratory of the Philippines in 1628
San Domenico
Santi Biagio e Romualdo
Sant'Onofrio - Church rebuilt in 1727
The Benedictine Abbey
St Augustine
Santa Caterina da Siena - Present church erected 1508
Collegiata of St. Nicholas
Santa Maria del Piangato
St Benedict
Oratory of the Gonfalone

Other buildings

Palazzo del Podestà (1255) built in white stone from Vallemontagnana and subsequently modified several times. It has a distinctive bridge structure, a memory of the stream which once flowed under it. The central arcade has frescoes from the 13th-14th centuries portraying warriors, and an enigmatic Wheel of Fortune moved by a feminine figure.
Sturinalto Fountain  (1285), designed by Jacopo di Grondolo, who was inspired by the Fontana Maggiore in Perugia.
Communal Palace  (c. 1350, rebuilt in 1690). It was the residence of the Chiavelli family, lords of the city until 1435. In the courtyard is a lapidarium with fragments of buildings of the ancient Roman cities of Attidium (Attiggio), Tuficum (Borgo Tufico) and Sentinum (Sassoferrato).
Pinacoteca Civica Bruno Malajoli displayed in the former Hospital (Spedale di Santa Maria del Buon Gesù) - The hospital was first built in 1456. The art collection of the Pinacoteca were moved here in 1994. The collection contains works by Rainaldetto di Ranuccio of Spoleto, Master of San Agostino, Master of San Emiliano, Master of the Magi (Fra Giovanni di Bartolomeo), Maestro dei Beati Becchetti, Puccio di Simone, Allegretto Nuzi, Francescuccio di Cecco Ghissi, Master of Fossato, Master of San Verecondo, Ottaviano Nelli, Master of Staffolo, Antonio da Fabriano, Bicci di Lorenzo, Neri di Bicci; Bernardino di Mariotto, Filippo da Verona, Venanzio da Camerino and Piergentile da Matelica, Simone de Magistris, Domiziano Domiziani, Girolamo or Giacomo Nardini, Andrea Boscoli, Orazio Gentileschi, Ambrogio Monaco, Francesco Podesti, and Gentile da Fabriano.
Loggiato of St. Francis (c. 1450)
Vasari Portico (1316)
Paper and Watermark Museum Fabriano
Villa Marchese del Grillo

Personalities
 Totila, penultimate king of the Ostrogoths, suffered his defeat at Taginae near Fabriano on  1 July 552 AD.
 Gentile da Fabriano, 15th-century painter, whose most famous work, an oil painting of the Epiphany, is in the Uffizi Gallery in Florence.
 Saint John dal Bastone 12th-century Silvestrine monk, born in Paterno.
 Francesco Stelluti, co-founder of the Accademia dei Lincei, born in Fabriano in 1577
 Jessica Rizzo (born 1965), pornographic actress and businesswoman.

See also
 Ariston Thermo
 Archivio storico delle Cartiere Miliani Fabriano
 Cartiere Miliani Fabriano
 Cassa di Risparmio di Fabriano e Cupramontana
 Elica
 Fabriano Basket
 Roman Catholic Diocese of Fabriano-Matelica

References

(Incorporates text from Bill Thayer's Gazetteer of Italy, by permission.)

External links

Fabriano official website
 Museo della Carta (Paper making museum)
Fabriano Storica - history, art, culture, legend, curiosity
Bill Thayer's site
Made in Fabriano Academy

Further reading
Albro, Sylvia Rodgers. Fabriano: City of Medieval and Renaissance Papermaking. Washington, DC, and New Castle, DE: Library of Congress and Oak Knoll Press, 2016.

 
Cities and towns in the Marche